Dwight O'Neal Johnson (born January 30, 1977 in Waco, Texas) is a former American football defensive end in the National Football League for the Philadelphia Eagles and the New York Giants. He played college football at Baylor University. He also played for the New England Patriots and was cut after the 2004-2005 season after they beat the Philadelphia Eagles in Super Bowl 39. He now owns and lives in McDonough, Georgia at a Speed, Agility and Strength facility named Total Athlete.

His mother Beverly Johnson lives in Waco, TX as well as his sister Daphanie Latchison. His older brother Dwayne Johnson lives in Houston, TX. 

His younger brother, Derrick Johnson, plays for the Kansas City Chiefs. 

1970 births
American football defensive linemen
Baylor Bears football players
Frankfurt Galaxy players
Living people
New York Giants players
Sportspeople from Waco, Texas
Philadelphia Eagles players